Doug Coulston (born 12 August 1971) is a Scottish footballer who played as a midfielder for Livingston.

Playing career
Coulston began his professional career playing at Meadowbank Thistle.He remained at the club during their renaming and relocation in 1995.  The midfielder departed the club in 1996 having made 5 appearances in total for Meadowbank Thistle and Livingston.

After leaving the Almondvale Stadium, he had spells at Cowdenbeath and Montrose. 

The midfielder signed for Angus rivals Brechin in 1999 and went on to make 54 appearances for the City, including a fourth round Scottish Cup defeat against Rangers at Ibrox Stadium. 

He signed for East Fife in 2001, but struggled to make an impact at the club.  After 4 appearances that season, he departed the club to return to Brechin.

Coulston's appearances for the City were limited in his second spell, and he left the club once again after just 6 appearances during the 2002-2003 season.  He re-signed for Montrose in the summer of 2003 and made 6 appearances before retiring from playing a year later.

Post playing career
After retiring from professional football, Coulston has been working as a PE teacher at St Columba's Roman Catholic High School.

References

External links
Dougie Coulston on Soccerbase

1971 births
Living people
Scottish footballers
Scottish Football League players
Association football midfielders
Livingston F.C. players
Cowdenbeath F.C. players
Montrose F.C. players
Brechin City F.C. players
East Fife F.C. players
Footballers from Glasgow